Charlie Colin is an American musician. He is the former bassist for the rock band Train. He also played guitar and provided background vocals for many other bands after his departure from the group in 2003.

Early life 
Colin began playing guitar at about eight when he lived in Virginia. Later, his family moved to Newport Beach, California. At Newport Harbor High School surfing, playing water polo, and the guitar became his constant companions.

Berklee College of Music 
Colin attended University of Southern California to explore his artistic gifts; then he transferred halfway to focus primarily on his musical gifts at Berklee College of Music in Boston. Attending Berklee got Colin fully immersed in music. He started playing with seniors for lessons and so he could learn more. Pat Metheny was quite a discovery, as well as other kinds of music discovered during Berklee.

Shortly afterwards, Colin got an offer from some friends to go to Singapore to write and play jingles.

Apostles 
After Singapore Colin, Jimmy Stafford (Train's future lead guitarist and mandolin player), and Rob Hotchkiss moved to San Francisco and started the group Apostles. The group got a record deal, recorded the album Apostles in 1992, but when the label folded, the members went their own ways. But they had a hunch that one day they would end up back together.

Train (band) 
Hotchkiss headed to San Francisco and met Pat Monahan, Train's future lead singer. The two collaborated on songs in the Bay Area and invited Jimmy Stafford to be the guitarist and Colin as the bassist. Colin brought in Scott Underwood to play drums. Thus formed in 1993 Train became very successful. Train scored their first Top 20 hit with 1999's "Meet Virginia," although their big breakthrough came with 2001's "Drops of Jupiter," which reached No. 5. The album Drops of Jupiter reached No. 6. on the Billboard 200. The group toured nationally, opening concerts for Hootie & the Blowfish, Sheryl Crow, Counting Crows, and Barenaked Ladies.

But in 2003, Colin left the band because of substance abuse.

Food Pill 
During the autumn of 2002, after Train finished promoting Drops of Jupiter with Matchbox Twenty Scott Underwood and Colin moved to a "huge psychedelic mansion" called The Paramour in West Hollywood to collaborate and record music. They decided to call the collaboration Food Pill and their first album was called Elixir.

In 2014, Charlie Colin, replaced Jesse Vest of Days of the New on bass so the band could continue touring.

Painbirds 
In 2015, Colin and Hotchkiss put together a band called Painbirds, with Sausalito singer-songwriter Tom Luce from Luce, whose ear candy hit "Good Day" cracked the Top 40 in 2001. This band released six songs on an eponymous debut EP.

The Side Deal 
The Side Deal is an American band from Newport Beach, California. The band was formed in 2017 Colin, Stan Frazier of Sugar Ray and brothers Joel and Scott Owen of The PawnShop Kings.  Side Deal performed live with other notable artists such as Jeff "Skunk" Baxter of The Doobie Brothers, Steely Dan and Alice Cooper.

In 2019, Collin appeared on guitar/bass and vocals while recording Featherborn for musician and vocalist Danny Beissel at the iconic Blackbird Studio in Nashville with veteran engineer John McBride.

Colin has been a longstanding curator, art collector, homeless-artist advocate, and philanthropist.

Awards and nominations

Grammy Awards 
 2002 | Drops of Jupiter (Tell Me) | Best Rock Song | Won 
2002 | Drops of Jupiter (Tell Me) | Best Instrumental Arrangement Accompanying Vocalist(s) | Won 
2002 | Drops of Jupiter (Tell Me) | Record of the Year | Nominated 
2002 | Drops of Jupiter (Tell Me) | Song of the Year | Nominated 
2002 | Drops of Jupiter (Tell Me) | Best Rock Performance by a Duo or Group with Vocal | Nominated

Publications 
  Williams, LG, The Book Of Charlie (PCP Press, 2016)

References

External links 
Charlie Colin on IMDb
Colin's Homeless Art Project
Grammy Award Winning Artist: Charlie Colin
Foodpill Website
The Side Deal Website
Train Website

Year of birth missing (living people)
Living people
American bass guitarists
Place of birth missing (living people)
Berklee College of Music alumni
Newport Harbor High School alumni
Train (band) members